Charles McDougall is a British Emmy Award and BAFTA-winning director.

Biography
McDougall has directed for popular television series which include the pilot episode of ABC's Desperate Housewives (which includes the unaired pilot as well). McDougall has also directed episodes of Queer as Folk on Channel 4 and Sex and the City on HBO. McDougall directed the first two episodes of the US TV Series The Tudors as well as an episode of Good Behavior. He won an Emmy for Best Directing for a Comedy Series for his work on Desperate Housewives.

McDougall was an executive producer and director for the pilot episode of The Good Wife. Penned by Robert King and Michelle King (In Justice) the legal drama focuses on a politician's wife (Julianna Margulies) who carves out her own niche as a defense attorney. The Kings and McDougall are executive producing with Ridley Scott, Tony Scott and David Zucker.

Filmography

Film

Television

References

External links
 

British film directors
British television directors
Living people
Primetime Emmy Award winners
Year of birth missing (living people)